Balıkesir Koca Seyit Airport , previously known as Balıkesir Edremit Körfez Airport, is an airport located south of Edremit in the Balıkesir Province of Turkey. The airport's name was changed to Balıkesir Koca Seyit Airport in July 2012 by the Turkish Government.

Airlines and destinations

Statistics

References

External links
 

Airports in Turkey
Buildings and structures in Balıkesir Province
Transport in Balıkesir Province